An ammunition technical officer (ATO) is an officer involved in all aspects of the army, air force, and navy's use of ammunition. This includes: bomb disposal, clearance of ERW, explosives accident investigation, procurement, in service management, storage, and inspection and repair.

British Army
ATOs are generally selected as captains, exclusively from within the Royal Logistic Corps; however when an ammunition technician (AT) warrant officer (WO) or senior non-commissioned officer (SNCO) is selected for commission, their AT qualification transfers to that of an ATO. One such example is Major Peter Norton GC.

ATO training takes 17 months and requires attendance at the Royal Military College of Science and the Defence EOD Munitions Search School Kineton, formerly known as the Army School of Ammunition. After conclusion of the training, the new ATO may take command of an EOD troop within 11 Explosive Ordnance Disposal and Search Regiment RLC or be employed within an ammunition squadron or ammunition depot. 

In 11 EOD & Search Regiment RLC or 33 EOD & Search Regiment RE, the ATO performs, in addition to the troop commander's role, counterterrorism bomb disposal activities and IEDD within the UK, occasionally leading an EOD team.  WO and SNCO ATs routinely lead those EOD teams, and when doing so are often embarrassingly referred to as the ATO. 

ATs and ATOs can undergo further EOD training at the Felix Centre within the Defence EOD Munitions Search School Kineton. ATOs alongside ATs are the UK's ammunition experts, with many years of experience in Palestine, Aden, Cyprus, Northern Ireland, the Balkans, Iraq, Afghanistan, and anywhere where the British Army have forces deployed and require EOD expertise and advice.  

Armed forces of other nations also have ATOs, some of which are trained by the British Army. These countries include Canada, New Zealand, and Singapore. Canadian ATOs, however have not been trained by the British since 2012 and complete their training at the Royal Military College of Canada and the Canadian Forces Logistics Training Centre.

Operational honours

George Cross
Lieutenant WM Eastman GC, Royal Army Ordnance Corps. 24 December 1940.
Captain RL Jephson-Jones GC, Royal Army Ordnance Corps. 24 December 1940.
Major George Styles GC, Royal Army Ordnance Corps. 11 January 1972.
Captain Peter Norton GC, Royal Logistic Corps. 24 July 2005.
Captain Joe Varey GC. Royal Logistic Corps, 24 July 2005.

George Medal
Capt Daniel Marc Shepherd GM, Royal Logistic Corps. 19 March 2010. Killed whilst clearing Improvised Explosive Devices (IEDs) in Helmand Province, Afghanistan.

Military Cross
Captain SD Bratcher MC, Royal Logistic Corps. 24 March 2006.
Major ID Scattergood MBE MC, Royal Logistic Corps. 25 July 2008.

Queen's Gallantry Medal
Captain Vincent Michael Strafford QGM, Royal Logistic Corps. 19 July 2007.
Captain Wayne Edward James Owers MBE QGM, Royal Logistic Corps. 19 March 2010.

Queen's Gallantry Medal with Bar
Captain Eamon Conrad Heakin QGM*, Royal Logistic Corps. 7 March 2008.
Captain Vincent Michael Strafford QGM*, Royal Logistic Corps. 7 March 2008.

Australian Army
The Australian Army also employs ATOs, who are members of the Royal Australian Army Ordnance Corps (RAAOC). RAAOC ATOs are trained in Australia, and this training has also been made available to members of other regional (Asia/South Pacific) Defence Forces.

Pakistan Army
The Pakistan Army has ATOs who are trained at the Pakistan Army Ordnance College. They are selected from the officers of the Pakistan Army Ordnance Corps in almost the same manner as that of the British Army ATOs. They are specialists in the ammunition field, and have many years of experience within Pakistan and other countries, such as Liberia, Congo, Ivory Coast, Sudan, Congo, CAR and elsewhere the Pakistan Army is deployed as part of the UN. Pakistan ATOs have the unique honour of handling / clearing IEDs and completing EOD Operations during War On Terror in Swat, North and South Waziristan Agencies and even in the settled areas of the countries. Most of the ATOs have specialized from CIED and EOD Trg programmes covered by British and US EOD institutes to assist the Engineers Corps as a technical expert to handle all IEDs and supervise their EOD activities and clearance of ERW. The major part of ATOs was in recent Operation Zarb-e-Azab. It is imperative to note and mention here, that, every field formation of Pakistan Army has a specified ATO appointment amongst its Staff Appointments to work as Advisor on Ammunition Matters to the Formation Commander directly. In UN, ATOs of the Battalions and Sector HQ work hand in glove with UNMAS for all EOD operations and clearance of ERW.

South African Army
The role and function of the South African Ammunition Corps is to ensure that only safe and effective ammunition is supplied to the Department of Defence and other users. Their functions includes participation in research and development, quality assurance, unit inspection, maintenance and disposal of ammunition. Candidates must have a sound psychological profile exhibiting a high degree of intelligence, steadiness and an aptitude or innovative technical thinking. Learners must be in possession of a National Senior Certificate (Grade 12) or Level 4 (N3) certificate and must have passed Mathematics and Physical Science.

Bangladesh Army
The Ammunition Technical Officers (ATOs) of Bangladesh Army are selected technically proficient and confident officers of Bangladesh Army Ordnance Corps. They are trained at Ordnance Centre and School (OC&S) of Bangladesh Army for 32 weeks duration on various Ammunition, Explosives, EOD, CIED and IEDD, CBRNE and all management matters related to these fields. After this long arduous journey of training, the newly qualified ammunition/explosive experts are inducted in the valiant group of ATOs of Bangladesh Army. Furthermore, many of them attain foreign training on ammunition/explosives and IED related fields from renowned institutions of the world. These ATOs are specialists in the munitions and explosives arena, and have many years of experience within Bangladesh and other countries, such as Kuwait, Liberia, DR Congo, Ivory Coast, Sudan, CAR, Mali, Somalia and elsewhere the Bangladesh Army is deployed as part of the UN force. 

ATOs of Bangladesh Army are always ready to face any eventualities in the Field Formation, during field firing or heavy weapon firing, while working in assistance to civil administration and in the overseas employments. At present, they are performing following core responsibilities:

 Perform as ATO in the unit, formations and on deputation. 
 Provide ATO support to Border Guard Bangladesh (BGB), Bangladesh Police and Rapid Action Battalion (RAB) Forces. 
 Perform as EOD and IEDD operator. 
 Employed as Counter-IED (C-IED) enablers such as IEDD/EOD site exploitation teams, Weapon Technical Intelligence (WTI) Teams, the Intelligence Community (IC), and CIED staffs at various levels. 
 Perform responsibility in UN Peacekeeping missions and various overseas employment as ATO/ SATO/ EOD Operator/ IEDD Operator. 
 Render technical advices on ammunitions, explosives, UXO and IEDs. 
 Perform the responsibility of instructor on ammunitions, explosives, EOD, IEDD, CIED, CBRN and all matters related to these fields.

ATOs need to be intelligent in his thoughts and actions. They also need to handle any eventualities very confidently and prudently. In doing so, the ATOs of Bangladesh Army always abreast themselves with up to date knowledge on latest development of trends of warfare, ammunition / explosives and IEDs, related policies and procedures, and care and maintenance as part of professional development through specialized training, self-study and interaction with experts in this field. ATOs of Bangladesh Army also have the scope to remain updated on the EOD, CIED & IEDD and CBRN matters under the umbrella of Bangladesh Army C-IED Fusion Centre (BACFC) and Subject Matter Expert Exchange (SMEE) with renowned institutions of the world. 

Most of the employments in respect of ammunition stockpile management is done by ATOs in Bangladesh Army, such as: 

ATOs are to remain a practitioner on specific ammo/explosives related appointment and required to undertake diverse and multi-layered refresher and currency training to maintain the competency level; only to validate their authorization as National Ammo Inspector empowered by allotted ATO number. This authorization is subject to revoke, if the individual fails to perform.

References

See also
 Ammunition Technician (AT)

British Army specialisms
Bomb disposal
Royal Logistic Corps